Kostomlaty nad Labem is a municipality and village in Nymburk District in the Central Bohemian Region of the Czech Republic. It has about 1,900 inhabitants.

Administrative parts
Villages of Hronětice, Lány, Rozkoš and Vápensko are administrative parts of Kostomlaty nad Labem.

Geography
It lies in the Central Elbe Table lowland within the Polabí region. The municipality is situated on the right bank of the Elbe River, which forms the southern municipal border. The river Vlkava flows through the municipality into the Elbe.

History
The first written mention of Kostomlaty is from 1223. Existence of a castle in Kostomlaty was documented in the mid-14th century, but in 1553 at the latest, the castle was already abandoned. In the 1420s, the village and the castle were acquired by Hynek Boček of Poděbrady, and in 1458, Kostomlaty passed into ownership of King George of Poděbrady. Later it was inherited by his descendants, then it often changed owners. Among the most important owners was the Sporck family, who held it from 1647 to 1722 as a part of the Lysá estate.

Sights
The landmark of Kostomlaty nad Labem is the Church of Saint Bartholomew, built in 1778.

Notable people
Bohuslava Kecková (1854–1911), physician; died here
Antonie Stárová (born 1998), footballer

Gallery

References

External links

 

Villages in Nymburk District